Ingression may refer to:

 Ingression (biology)
 Ingression coast

See also
 Ingress (disambiguation)
 Ingressive sound